Servants of the Empire is a young reader science fiction novel series by Jason Fry. Set in the Star Wars universe, the novels are affiliated with the television series Star Wars Rebels and follow the Rebels character Zare Leonis.

Novels
 Servants of the Empire: Edge of the Galaxy (October 21, 2014)
 Servants of the Empire: Rebel in the Ranks (March 3, 2015)
 Servants of the Empire: Imperial Justice (July 7, 2015)
 Servants of the Empire: The Secret Academy (October 6, 2015)

References

External links
 

American science fiction novels
Books based on Star Wars
Science fiction book series
Star Wars Rebels
Young adult novel series